The Inclusion Catamaran is a modern wheelchair-accessible sailing catamaran that was designed by naval engineer Frederico Cerveira, founder of Inclusive Sailing.

The catamaran was developed using principles of universal design. Universal design intends to develop products that can be accessible by everyone, regardless of factors such as age, disabilities and physical limitations.

Design 
The Inclusion Catamaran has a length overall of 7,5 m, a 4,5 m beam and 0,8 m draft.

Regarding the rig, the boat has a Bermuda rig. The mainsail has an area of 18 m2, the jib 6 m2 and the gennaker 20 m2.

Its stable deck has a maximum crew capacity of 10 people, including 4 wheelchair users, and in each hull there is space for storage and beds.

Adaptations for disabled people 
The boat has specially designed doors that enable wheelchairs users to onboard without the need for cranes. It is also equipped with adaptive systems for the rudders and sails.

References 

Sailboat types
Keelboats
Catamarans
Disabled boating